Haemonides cronis is a moth in the Castniidae family. It is found in Mexico, Trinidad, Suriname, French Guiana, Brazil and Peru.

Adults have been recorded feeding on flowers of Warszewiczia coccinea.

The larvae have been recorded feeding on Bombacopsis quinata.

Subspecies
Haemonides cronis cronis (Suriname, French Guiana, Mexico, Trinidad)
Haemonides cronis emiliae (Fassl, 1921) (Brazil)
Haemonides cronis odila (Houlbert, 1917) (Peru)

References

Moths described in 1775
Castniidae
Moths of Central America
Moths of South America
Taxa named by Pieter Cramer